KQQJ is a Christian radio station licensed to Juneau, Alaska, broadcasting on 90.7 MHz FM.  KQQJ is owned by the Juneau Seventh-Day Adventist Church.

References

External links
KQQJ's website

QQJ